Oriental MS 1001, Bohairic-Arabic, uncial manuscript of the New Testament, on paper. It is dated to the year 1663. Horner designated the manuscript by siglum H3.

Description 

It contains a complete text of the four Gospels on 253 paper leaves (30 by 21 cm), in octavo. The text is written in two columns per page, 36 lines per page.

It contains the Eusebian tables, Prolegomena, tables of the  before each Gospel, and pictures; it is illuminated. the Ammonian sections and a references to the Eusebian Canons in red.

The nomina sacra are written in an abbreviated way.

History 

It is dated by a colophon to the year 1663.

In 1721 it was presented to the Church of Our Lady and Saint George in Harat ar-Rum. Lightfoot, Arthur Headlam examined the manuscript.

Currently it is housed at the British Library (Oriental MS 1316) in London.

See also 

 List of the Coptic New Testament manuscripts
 Coptic versions of the Bible
 Biblical manuscript
 Additional MS 14470
 Oriental MS 425

References

Further reading 
 George Horner, The Coptic Version of the New Testament in the Northern Dialect, otherwise called Memphitic and Bohairic, 1 vol. (1898), pp. CI-CII

Coptic New Testament manuscripts
17th-century biblical manuscripts
British Library oriental manuscripts
17th-century illuminated manuscripts